Carl Joseph Fast ((also written as 法士) Foochow Romanized: Huák-sê̤ṳ; October 8, 1822 – November 13, 1850) was the second Swedish missionary sent to China and the first Protestant missionary murdered in Fuzhou.

On January 1, 1850, Fast arrived in Foochow (today Fuzhou) as the missionary from the Lutheran Lund Missionary Society of Sweden, and was joined by  later that year. The mission they set up in China was short-lived. On November 13, 1850, the two missionaries were brutally assaulted by Chinese pirates when they were coming up the River Min after getting money from a ship. Armed with a pistol Elgqvist survived the attack, but Fast was killed on the spot.

Fast was buried in Fuzhou Nantai. An order was given by then-Fujian Governor Xu Jiyu to capture the murderers within three days, and the case was finally settled on November 18, with three criminals brought to justice.

References

External links
Article at Svenskt biografiskt lexikon

1822 births
1850 deaths
Swedish Lutheran missionaries
Lutheran missionaries in China
Christian missionaries in Fujian
Swedish people murdered abroad
People murdered in China
Swedish expatriates in China
People from Lilla Edet Municipality
19th-century Lutherans